Sebastián Nahuel Prieto (born 9 April 1993) is an Argentine professional footballer who plays as a left-back for Tigre.

Career
Prieto, after passing through Lanús' academy, began his senior career with Talleres. His second season with the club, 2015, concluded with promotion to Primera B Metropolitana, after he made fifty-six appearances and scored one goal. He stayed for two further campaigns, netting five times as they secured sixth and sixteenth place finishes. In July 2017, Prieto completed a move across the third tier to UAI Urquiza. One goal in thirty-seven encounters followed, with Defensores de Belgrano eliminating them in the play-off finals. In June 2018, Temperley of Primera B Nacional signed Prieto. His first goal came in 2019 versus Ferro Carril Oeste.

Career statistics
.

References

External links

1993 births
Living people
Place of birth missing (living people)
Argentine footballers
Association football defenders
Primera B Metropolitana players
Primera Nacional players
Talleres de Remedios de Escalada footballers
UAI Urquiza players
Club Atlético Temperley footballers
Club Atlético Tigre footballers